Ormskirk was a county constituency represented in the House of Commons of the Parliament of the United Kingdom. It elected one Member of Parliament (MP) by the first past the post system of election. It was created by the Redistribution of Seats Act 1885 as a division of the parliamentary county of Lancashire. The constituency boundaries were changed in 1918, 1950, 1955 and 1974.

History 

The constituency was a Labour - Conservative marginal for much of its history, changing hands several times between the two parties during its 98-year existence.

The seat was initially a safe Conservative seat under the influence of the Stanleys, the Earls of Derby. Indeed, the seat was held for twenty years by Arthur Stanley, a younger son of the 16th Earl. The only serious challenge by the Liberal Party in this period was in 1910 when William Lever, the leading industrialist, contested the seat. Indeed, this was the last time the Liberal Party would contest the constituency until the 1970s.

James Bell became the first non Conservative to be elected for this seat since its creation in 1885, principally due to a divided conservative vote between the Coalition Conservatives and the candidate of the National Farmers Union at the 1918 general election. Francis Blundell regained the seat for the Conservatives in 1922 but was to lose it to Labour's Sam Tom Rosbotham in 1929.

Sam Tom followed Ramsay MacDonald when the Labour Party split in 1931, and then defended the seat successfully for National Labour in both 1931 and 1935.  He was succeeded in 1939 by Commander Stephen King-Hall for National Labour.

In a repeat of 1918, the election of 1945 saw future Prime Minister, Harold Wilson elected when the Conservative Party opted to stand against the National candidate, Stephen King-Hall, and split the anti Labour vote. With Harold Wilson moving in 1950 to the newly created Huyton constituency, the seat saw a succession of Conservative Members who were then moved on to the House of Lords, until the election of the much respected Colonel Douglas Glover in the 1953 by-election.

The retirement of Douglas Glover in 1970 saw the election of Harold Soref for the Conservatives who, however, was only to hold the seat for four years. Boundary changes brought in Kirkby New Town, leading to the election of Robert Kilroy-Silk for Labour.

The constituency ceased to exist with the implementation of the 1983 boundary changes. The sitting MP moved to the new Knowsley North seat.

Boundaries

1885–1918
The constituency, officially designated as South-West Lancashire, Ormskirk Division consisted of the town of Ormskirk and a number of surrounding parishes, namely:
Aintree, Aughton, Bickerstaffe, Croxteth Park, Dalton, Downholland, Halsall, Kirkby, Knowsley, Lathom, Litherland, Lunt, Lydiate, Maghull, Melling, Netherton, Ormskirk, Orrell and Ford, Prescot, Scarisbrick, Sefton, Simonswood, Skelmersdale & Upholland.

1918–50
The Representation of the People Act 1918 reorganised constituencies throughout the United Kingdom. Boundaries were adjusted and seats were defined in terms of the districts created by the Local Government Act 1894. According to the schedules of the Act, the Lancashire, Ormskirk Division comprised:

Formby Urban District
Lathom and Burscough Urban District
Ormskirk Urban District
Rainford Urban District
Skelmersdale Urban District
Upholland Urban District
Sefton Rural District
West Lancashire Rural District
The civil parish of Dalton from Wigan Rural District

1950–55
The Representation of the People Act 1948 redistributed parliamentary seats, with the constituencies first being used in the general election of 1950. The term "county constituency" was introduced in place of "division". Ormskirk County Constituency was redefined as consisting of the following districts:

Formby Urban District
Ormskirk Urban District
Rainford Urban District
West Lancashire Rural District (except the parishes of Aintree and Ford)

This reflected local government boundary changes in 1931–32: Lathom & Burscough UD had been absorbed by Ormskirk UD and Sefton RD by West Lancashire RD.

1955–74
Following further council boundary changes in 1954, the remaining parishes from West Lancashire RD, (Aintree and Ford), were included in the constituency from 1955.

1974–83
From 1970 the seat was again redefined, to cover the urban districts of Formby, Kirkby, Ormskirk and Rainford, and West Lancashire Rural District.

Abolition
The constituency was abolished by the Parliamentary Constituencies (England) Order 1983, which redrew constituencies based on the new counties and districts created in 1974.

The Ormskirk area became part of West Lancashire,  Kirkby was included in Knowsley North, Rainford in St Helens North and Formby, Aintree and Melling in Crosby.

Members of Parliament

Election results

Elections in the 1880s

Elections in the 1890s

Forwood's death caused a by-election.

Elections in the 1900s

Elections in the 1910s

Elections in the 1920s

Elections in the 1930s

1939 Ormskirk by-election
In the Ormskirk By-Election of 27 October 1939, Stephen King-Hall, National Labour was elected unopposed.

Elections in the 1940s

Elections in the 1950s

Elections in the 1960s

Elections in the 1970s

See also
West Lancashire Constituency

Sources

Election results, 1950 - 1979
F. W. S. Craig, British Parliamentary Election Results 1918 - 1949
F. W. S. Craig, British Parliamentary Election Results 1885 - 1918

References

Ormskirk
Parliamentary constituencies in North West England (historic)
Constituencies of the Parliament of the United Kingdom established in 1885
Constituencies of the Parliament of the United Kingdom disestablished in 1983
Politics of the Borough of West Lancashire